Daimary is a surname found among the Boro people of north-eastern India. Daimary comes from the word Daima-ároi, meaning River-folk

Notable people 
People with this surname include:
Biswajit Daimary (born 1971), Indian politician
Mithinga Daimary (born 1967), Indian politician
Rihon Daimary (born 1960), Indian politician

See also
Bodo Sahitya Sabha
Boro language
Narzary

References 

Occupational surnames
Surnames of Indian origin
Bodo-language surnames